Dennis Francis Donovan (April 9, 1889 – September 16, 1974) was a United States district judge of the United States District Court for the District of Minnesota.

Education and career

Born in Champion, Michigan, Donovan received a Bachelor of Laws from the University of Michigan Law School in 1913. He was in private practice in Duluth, Minnesota from 1914 to 1945.

Federal judicial service

On June 1, 1945, Donovan was nominated by President Harry S. Truman to a seat on the United States District Court for the District of Minnesota vacated by Judge George F. Sullivan. Donovan was confirmed by the United States Senate on July 17, 1945, and received his commission on July 18, 1945. He assumed senior status on December 31, 1965, serving in that capacity until his death on September 16, 1974, in Rochester, Minnesota.

References

Sources
 

1889 births
1974 deaths
University of Michigan Law School alumni
People from Marquette County, Michigan
Judges of the United States District Court for the District of Minnesota
United States district court judges appointed by Harry S. Truman
20th-century American judges